Ericka Natalia Portilla Barrios (born 4 January 1985) is a Chilean lawyer who was elected as a member of the Chilean Constitutional Convention.

She was Regional Ministerial Secretary of Minning of the III Region of Atacama.

References

External links
 
 BCN Profile

Living people
Chilean women lawyers
21st-century Chilean politicians
Communist Party of Chile politicians
University of Atacama alumni
Members of the Chilean Constitutional Convention
21st-century Chilean women politicians
People from Atacama Region
1985 births
21st-century Chilean lawyers